4,4′-Thiodianiline (TDA) is the organosulfur compound with the formula (H2NC6H4)2S.  It is classified as a diamine and a thioether.  A colorless solid, it is used as a precursor to dyes. An analogue of TDA is dapsone.

Synthesis 
Sulfur is boiled in excess aniline over several hours to produce three isomers (1,1′; 1,4; 4,4′) of TDA. The same journal documents syntheses of similar and overlapping compounds by Merz and Weith in 1871, and K. A. Hoffman in 1894. A study by Nietzki and Bothof shows indications that including an oxide of lead may maximize the yield of the 4,4′ variant that this page refers to.

Uses 
TDA was used as a chemical intermediate in the production of three dyes: CI mordant yellow 16, milling red G and milling red FR, as well as the medicine Dapsone. TDA has also been used in the synthesis of polyimine vitrimers.

Production
TDA is no longer produced in the USA.

Toxicity
TDA has caused mutations in some strains of Salmonella typhimurium and has caused tumors in laboratory mice and rats.

Related compounds
 4,4'-Oxydianiline
 4,4'-Methylenedianiline
 Dapsone

References 

Anilines
Carcinogens
Thioethers